Talata Tsimadilo is a rural commune in Madagascar. It belongs to the district of Arivonimamo, which is a part of Itasy Region. The population of the commune was 7,438 in 2018.

References

Populated places in Itasy Region